Viereggenhöfer Teich is a lake in Wismar, Mecklenburg-Vorpommern, Germany. At an elevation of 8 m, its surface area is 0.37 km².

Lakes of Mecklenburg-Western Pomerania
Ponds of Mecklenburg-Western Pomerania